Franz Müntefering (born 16 January 1940) is a German politician. He was Chairman of the Social Democratic Party (SPD) from 2004 to 2005 and again from 18 October 2008 to 13 November 2009. He served as the minister of Labour and Social Affairs, as well as the vice-chancellor of Germany, in the cabinet of Chancellor Angela Merkel from 2005 to 2007.

Early life and education
Müntefering was born in Neheim (now part of Arnsberg). He trained as an industrial salesman and worked for local metalwork companies.

Political career
Müntefering joined the SPD in 1966. He was a member of the Bundestag from 1975 to 1992 and again since 1998.

From 1992 until 1995, Müntefering served as State Minister of Labor, Health and Social Affairs in the government of Minister-President Johannes Rau of North Rhine-Westphalia. He was a member of the State Parliament of North Rhine-Westphalia 1995 to 1998.

Müntefering was Bundesgeschäftsführer (executive director) of the national SPD from 1995 to 1998. In this capacity, he managed the 1998 campaign that returned the SPD to power in the federal government after 16 years in opposition.

From 1998 until 1999, Müntefering briefly held the post of Minister of Transportation and Construction in the first cabinet of Chancellor Gerhard Schröder. In this capacity, he organized the government's move from Bonn to Berlin.

Müntefering was the first to hold the new post of SPD Secretary General from 1999 to 2002, and thereafter became leader of the SPD parliamentary group in the Bundestag.

Chairman of the SPD, 2004–2005
In June 2004 Müntefering was designated to succeed Schröder as party chairman in July 2004.

Following Schröder's defeat in the close 2005 elections, Müntefering helped form a grand coalition under the new Chancellor Angela Merkel and her center-right CDU/CSU parties. During the coalition talks, on 31 October 2005, Müntefering's favoured candidate for Secretary General of the SPD, Kajo Wasserhövel, was defeated by the left-wing candidate Andrea Nahles in a preliminary internal election. Müntefering subsequently announced his intention to resign as SPD Chairman, and was succeeded by Matthias Platzeck at the next party convention on 15 November 2005.

Vice-Chancellor and Federal Minister of Labour and Social Affairs, 2005–2007
Müntefering became Federal Minister of Labour and Social Affairs and Vice-Chancellor in the cabinet of Chancellor Angela Merkel on 22 November 2005. During his time in office, the government agreed to raise the retirement age in steps to 67 from 65 by 2029.

After two years in those posts, Müntefering's spokesman said on 13 November 2007 that Müntefering would resign from them later in the month. The decision was said to be based on "purely familial reasons". Later in the day, Müntefering said that he would leave his positions in the government on 21 November attributing his decision to the illness of his wife, Ankepetra, who was suffering from cancer. Upon leaving office on 21 November 2007, he was replaced as Vice-Chancellor by Frank-Walter Steinmeier and as Minister of Labor by Olaf Scholz, both of whom are also members of the SPD.

Chairman of the SPD, 2008–2009
Müntefering's wife Ankepetra died on 31 July 2008. Following her death, Müntefering decided to return to active politics and was elected Chairman of the Social Democratic Party of Germany on 18 October 2008. On 7 September 2008, Kurt Beck had resigned as SPD Chairman.

Following the SPD's defeat in the federal election of 2009, Müntefering resigned from the position of party chairman of the Social Democratic Party.

Political positions
In April 2005, Müntefering criticized the market economy of Germany and proposed more state involvement to promote economic justice. In this speech, he described private equity firms as "locusts". He subsequently published a "locust list" of companies, which he circulated within the SPD. This began a debate which dominated the national news, being the subject of front-page articles and covered on the main television news broadcasts nearly every day. Müntefering's suggestions were criticized by employers and many economists, but met with popular support (up to 75% in some opinion polls). The word has since found its way into German language as an established term for shady financial business practices.

Life after politics
Since leaving active politics, Müntefering has held a variety of honorary positions, including the following:
 German Foundation for Active Citizenship and Volunteering (DSEE), Member of the Board of Trustees (since 2020)
 Berlin Demography Forum, chairman of the Advisory Board
 Friedrich Ebert Foundation (FES), Member
 Witten/Herdecke University, Member of the Board of Trustees (since 2014)
 Herbert and Greta Wehner Foundation, Member of the Board (since 2002)
 Deutsche Hospiz- und PalliativStiftung, Member of the Board of Trustees
 German National Association of Senior Citizens' Organizations (BAGSO), chairman since 2015

Müntefering was a SPD delegate to the Federal Convention for the purpose of electing the President of Germany in 2017.

Controversy
In 2002, news surfaced that, while Müntefering was head of the SPD in the North Rhine-Westphalia during the 1990s, local officials in the city of Cologne and possibly elsewhere allegedly engaged in corruption that involved illegal political donations from builders of waste-disposal facilities. Müntefering denied any knowledge of the anonymous donations and launched an internal investigation into all contracts awarded for the construction of waste-disposal facilities in North Rhine-Westphalia in the 1990s. On 22 March, he testified about the affair before Parliament's investigative committee.

References

External links
 Biography by German Bundestag

1940 births
Living people
People from Arnsberg
People from the Province of Westphalia
Transport ministers of Germany
Construction ministers of Germany
Social Affairs ministers of Germany
Labor ministers (Germany)
Members of the Bundestag for North Rhine-Westphalia
Vice-Chancellors of Germany
Members of the Landtag of North Rhine-Westphalia
Members of the Bundestag 2009–2013
Members of the Bundestag 2005–2009
Members of the Bundestag 2002–2005
Members of the Bundestag 1998–2002
Members of the Bundestag 1990–1994
Members of the Bundestag for the Social Democratic Party of Germany